Paljakka Strict Nature Reserve is a strict nature reserve located in the Kainuu region of Finland. It consists of old, high spruce forest, where the highest trees can reach . Finland's only orchid species, Cypripedium calceolus, grows in the Paljakka reserve.

Strict nature reserves of Finland
Geography of Kainuu
Puolanka
Nature of Hyrynsalmi